Priest River National Forest was established as the Priest River Forest Reserve by the General Land Office in Idaho and Washington on February 22, 1897 with . After the transfer of federal forests to the U.S. Forest Service in 1905,it became a National Forest on March 4, 1907. On July 1, 1908 the entire forest was divided to establish Kaniksu National Forest and Pend Oreille National Forest and the name was discontinued.

References

External links
Forest History Society
Listing of the National Forests of the United States and Their Dates (from Forest History Society website) Text from Davis, Richard C., ed. Encyclopedia of American Forest and Conservation History. New York: Macmillan Publishing Company for the Forest History Society, 1983. Vol. II, pp. 743–788.

Former National Forests of Idaho
Former National Forests of Washington (state)